Finch Hatton may refer to:

 the family of Earl of Winchilsea and Nottingham
 Harold Heneage Finch-Hatton, English politician and Australian federalist
 Finch Hatton, Queensland, a town in Australia